Disney's Vero Beach Resort is a Disney Vacation Club resort located eleven miles north of Vero Beach in Wabasso Beach, on State Route A1A. Established in 1995, it was the first Disney Vacation Club resort to be constructed outside the Walt Disney World Resort.

Amenities

Disney's Vero Beach Resort is located on the beachfront. The property includes a small waterpark, spa, grill, and a bar.

Closures
In March 2020, Vero Beach Resort had unscheduled closure due to the COVID-19 pandemic. It reopened on June 15, 2020.

References

External links 
 

Vero Beach Resort
Buildings and structures in Vero Beach, Florida
Tourist attractions in Indian River County, Florida
Resorts in Florida
1995 establishments in Florida